Isabella Jakubiak (born 28 June 1983) is an Australian self-taught cook known for winning the 2011 series of reality television cooking programme, My Kitchen Rules with her sister Sammy.

Personal life 
Jakubiak was born in Sydney, Australia and is of Polish heritage. Her heritage and family members working in the food service industry serve as a source of inspiration for her cooking.

My Kitchen Rules 
Bella Jakubiak and sister Sammy showcased both traditional and reinvented Polish cuisine as contestants on series 2 of My Kitchen Rules in 2011. The Sydney-based pair won the Grand Final broadcast on 13 April 2011, beating Victoria pair Kane and Lee.

Current activities 
Jakubiak appears in regular bi-weekly segment on Channel 7’s The Morning Show. She also hosts her own TV show alongside sister Sammy, Food For Life. Bella appears as a home cooking expert for LifeStyle Food.

In 2012 Jakubiak launched a Sydney based catering business, bellasfeast.

Bella has performed cooking demonstrations at Australian food shows, including the Good Food & Wine Show, since 2012.

In 2015 Bella Jakubiak co-founded a range of sauces under the brand name Saucy Sister.

Jakubiak has been ambassador to Passionfruit Australia in 2013, 2014 and 2015.

Since 2011, Bella has run a successful recipe blog.

References

Australian chefs
Living people
1983 births
Australian people of Polish descent
People from Sydney